Claudie Blakley (born 4 January 1974) is an English actress. She trained at the Central School of Speech and Drama. In 1998, she won the Ian Charleson Award for her performance in The Seagull at the West Yorkshire Playhouse in Leeds. She is best known for her role as Emma Timmins in the BBC drama series Lark Rise to Candleford.

Other notable roles include Mabel Nesbitt in Robert Altman's Oscar-winning Gosford Park and Charlotte Lucas in Joe Wright's 2005 version of Pride and Prejudice. In the autumn of 2007, she was seen in the BBC serial Cranford as Martha.

In 2010, Blakley played the role of Cynthia Lennon in the BBC television production of Lennon Naked, a drama based on the period in the life of John Lennon from the years 1964 to 1971. In 2013, she appeared in the premiere of the play Chimerica.

Family 
Her father was Alan Blakley, a member of the 1960s pop band the Tremeloes, her mother Lin Blakley, is an actress known for her work on EastEnders playing Pam Coker from 2014 to 2016.

Filmography

Film

Television

Theatre

Radio

References

External links 

1974 births
Living people
20th-century English actresses
21st-century English actresses
Actresses from Berkshire
Alumni of the Royal Central School of Speech and Drama
English film actresses
English radio actresses
English Shakespearean actresses
English stage actresses
English television actresses
Ian Charleson Award winners